Bhishan Dinharu (Nepali भिषण दिनहरु) is a memoir of a Maoist spy who operated during the Maoist insurgency in Nepal.

The book was launched along with Radha Paudel's war memoir Khalangama Hamala 23 May 2013.

References

Maoism in Nepal
Nepalese memoirs
Nepalese autobiographies